Jordan Kunaszyk (born October 15, 1996) is an American football linebacker who is a free agent. He played college football at California and signed with the Carolina Panthers as an undrafted free agent in 2019.

Early life and high school
Kunaszyk was born in Sacramento, California and grew up in nearby Roseville, where he attended Roseville High School and played football. In his first year of varsity football, Kunaszyk notched 77 tackles (nine for loss), three sacks, two forced fumbles and two fumble recoveries and was named second-team All-Sierra Foothill League and was named first-team all league as a senior after recording 101 tackles (21 for loss), 2.0 sacks, one interception and a forced fumble.

College career

Kunaszyk began his collegiate career at American River College. He was forced to redshirt his true freshman season after breaking his wrist while playing his first snap of the year. The following season he recorded 118 tackles (the most of any California junior college player), three sacks, one forced fumble and three pass breakups and was named first-team All-Big 8 Conference, a Junior College Freshman All-American and the CCCAA NorCal Division Defensive Player of the Year. Following the season he committed to transfer to California for the final three seasons of his NCAA eligibility over offers from Colorado, Iowa State, UNLV and Fresno State.

In his first season with the Bears, Kunaszyk made 51 tackles as a reserve linebacker. As a redshirt junior, he tallied 74 tackles, 3.5 sacks and two interceptions with a forced fumble and a fumble recovery despite missing three games to injury. In his final season, Kunaszyk made 148 tackles (11 for loss), four sacks and five forced fumbles with three pass breakups and an interception and was named first-team All-Pac-12 Conference and second-team All-America by Sports Illustrated.

Professional career

Carolina Panthers
Kunaszyk signed with the Carolina Panthers as an undrafted free agent on April 27, 2019. He made his NFL debut on September 12, 2019 against the Tampa Bay Buccaneers, playing 15 snaps on special teams. Kunaszyk played in nine games, recording seven tackles. Kunaszyk was waived on September 5, 2020.

Washington Football Team
Kunaszyk signed with the practice squad of the Washington Football Team on September 26, 2020. He was elevated to the active roster on November 14 and November 21 for the team's weeks 10 and 11 games against the Detroit Lions and Cincinnati Bengals, and reverted to the practice squad after each game. Kunaszyk was signed to the active roster on November 25, 2020. He was released on August 31, 2021, and re-signed to the practice squad the following day. Kunaszyk signed with the active roster on October 5, 2021.  On January 8, 2022, Kunaszyk was placed on the COVID-19 reserve list and officially ruled out of the last game of 2021 regular season.

On May 16, 2022, Kunaszyk was released.

Cleveland Browns
On August 9, 2022, Kunaszyk signed with the Cleveland Browns. He was released on September 5, 2022, and re-signed to the Browns' practice squad on September 6, 2022. He was promoted to the active roster on September 21. He played in 15 games with two starts, recording a career-high 22 tackles.

On February 14, 2023, Kunaszyk was released by the Browns.

References

External links

Cleveland Browns bio
California Golden Bears bio

1996 births
Living people
American football linebackers
American River Beavers football players
California Golden Bears football players
Carolina Panthers players
Cleveland Browns players
Players of American football from California
Sportspeople from Roseville, California
Washington Football Team players